Lu Yongzheng (born September 1967) is a Chinese politician and the current Director of the Publicity Department of the CCP Guizhou Committee.

Biography
Lu was born in September 1967 in Yiyang, Hunan. He entered Wuhan University in September 1985, majoring in Chinese language and literature at the Department of Chinese Literature, where he graduated in July 1989. He joined the Chinese Communist Party in January 1986 when he was a freshman.

After graduation, he was assigned to the People's Daily, he worked there until September 1993. In September 1997 he was transferred to the Communist Youth League, he served in several posts there, including director of Youth Volunteer Action Guidance Center and secretary of the Secretariat of the Central Committee. In May 2013 he was appointed deputy director of State Administration of Civil Service, a position he held until March 2016. Then he rose to become vice-governor of Guizhou. As vice-governor, he is responsible for the work of opening up, attracting investment, foreign trade, development zone and comprehensive insurance area construction management, human resources and social security, culture, tourism development and management, and the safety of production.

In January 2020, Lu was appointed as the Director of Publicity Department of the CCP Guizhou Committee.

References

1967 births
Politicians from Yiyang
Living people
Wuhan University alumni
Central Party School of the Chinese Communist Party alumni
Cheung Kong Graduate School of Business alumni
People's Republic of China politicians from Hunan
Chinese Communist Party politicians from Hunan